Biduiyeh-ye Kajin (also Romanized as Bīdū’īyeh-ye Kajīn; also known as Bīdū’īyeh) is a village in Kuh Shah Rural District, Ahmadi District, Hajjiabad County, Hormozgan Province, Iran. At the 2006 census, its population was 100, in 19 families.

References 

Populated places in Hajjiabad County